Domoraud is a West African surname. Notable people with the surname include:

Cyril Domoraud (born 1971), Ivorian footballer
Gilles Domoraud (born 1979), Ivorian footballer
Jean-Jacques Domoraud (born 1981), French footballer
Wilfried Domoraud (born 1988), Ivorian footballer

Surnames of African origin